Zlato Polje is a small village in the hills above Lukovica pri Domžalah in the eastern part of the Upper Carniola region of Slovenia.

References

External links

Zlato Polje on Geopedia

Populated places in the Municipality of Lukovica